X Factor is an Italian television music competition to find new singing talent; the winner was Giò Sada: he received a € 300,000 recording contract with Sony Music. Fedez and Mika would be confirmed as judges and mentors, while Skin and Elio have been chosen for replacing Morgan and Victoria Cabello in the role; also Alessandro Cattelan returned as host. The ninth season has been airing on Sky Uno since 10 September 2015.

Judges' houses

The "Home Visit" is the final phase before the Live Shows. In this phase, the contestants who passed the Bootcamp had to perform one last time in front of their specific judge, in four different locations. At the end of this audition, the top twelve contestants were chosen.

The twelve eliminated acts were:
Boys: Marco Gori, Angel Gabriel Marmolejos, Cranio Randagio  
Girls: Gaia Albertazzi, Martina Galli, Selene Capitanucci 
25+: David Aiyeniwon, Diego Esposito, Marco Sbarbati 
Groups: Iron Mais, Street Chords, OSC2X

Contestants and categories
Key:
 – Winner
 – Runner-up
 – Third place

Live shows

Results summary
The number of votes received by each act were released by Sky Italia after the final.

Colour key

Live show details

Week 1 (22 October 2015)
Celebrity performers: Duran Duran ("Pressure Off")

Judges' votes to eliminate
 Mika: Massimiliano D'Alessandro – backed his own act, Eva.
 Elio: Eva – backed his own act, Massimiliano D'Alessandro.
 Skin: Massimiliano D'Alessandro – said that she preferred Eva.
 Fedez: Massimiliano D'Alessandro – thought that Eva was better suited for the show.

Week 2 (29 October 2015)
Celebrity performers: Justin Bieber ("What Do You Mean?") and Francesca Michielin ("L'amore esiste" and "Lontano")

Judges' votes to eliminate
 Skin: Eva – backed her own act, Eleonora Anania.
 Mika: Eleonora Anania – backed his own act, Eva.
 Fedez: Eva – preferred Anania on the night.
 Elio: Eva – enhanced the uniqueness of Anania.

Week 3 (5 November 2015)
Celebrity performers: Emma ("Arriverà l'amore")

Judges' votes to eliminate
 Skin: Eleonora Anania – thought that Anania could go further in the competition.
 Mika: Eleonora Anania – said that he preferred Anania's voice.
 Fedez: Eleonora Anania – based on the final showdown performance.
 Elio was not required to vote as there was already a majority, but confirmed he would have eliminated Anania.

Week 4 (12 November 2015)
Celebrity performers: 5 Seconds of Summer ("Hey Everybody!") and Giorgio Moroder

Judges' votes to eliminate
 Mika: Margherita Principi – backed his own act, Luca Valenti.
 Skin: Luca Valenti – backed her own act, Margherita Principi.
 Elio: Margherita Principi – based on the final showdown performance.
 Fedez: Luca Valenti – could not decide so chose to take it to deadlock.
With both acts receiving two votes each, the result went to deadlock and a new public vote commenced for 200 seconds. Margherita Principi was eliminated as the act with the fewest public votes.

Week 5 (19 November 2015)

Judge's vote to eliminate
 Fedez: Giosada – backed his own act, Landlord
 Elio: Landlord – backed his own act, Giosada
 Skin: Landlord – gave no reason.
 Mika: Landlord – gave no reason.

Week 6: Quarter-final (26 November 2015)

Judges' votes to eliminate
 Mika: Enrica Tara – backed his own act, Luca Valenti.
 Skin: Luca Valenti – backed her own act, Enrica Tara.
 Elio: Luca Valenti – gave no reason
 Fedez: Enrica Tara – could not decide so chose to take it to deadlock.
With both acts receiving two votes each, the result went to deadlock and a new public vote commenced for 200 seconds. Luca Valenti was eliminated as the act with the fewest public votes.

Week 7: Semi-final (3 December 2015)

Judge's vote to eliminate
 Fedez: Enrica Tara – backed his own act, Moseek.
 Skin: Moseek – backed her own act, Enrica Tara.
 Mika: Enrica Tara – gave no reason.
 Elio: Moseek – could not decide so chose to take it to deadlock.
With both acts receiving two votes each, the result went to deadlock and reverted to the earlier public vote. Moseek were eliminated as the act with the fewest public votes.

Week 8: Final (10 December 2015)

External links
 X Factor Italia

2015 Italian television seasons
Italian music television series
Italy 09
X Factor (Italian TV series)